is a Japanese actor and voice actor from Nagano Prefecture. He is affiliated with Gekidan Subaru and is married to fellow voice actress Keiko Aizawa.

Filmography

Television animation
Mobile Suit Gundam ZZ (1986) (Meccha Mucha)
Ninku (1995) (General Maki)
Meiken Lassie (1996) (Richard Jones)
Rurouni Kenshin (1996) (Sakuramaru)
Go! Go! Itsutsugo Land (2001) (Yurika's dad)
Noir (2001) (Wellman)
One Piece (2001) (Doctor Hiruluk)
Tokyo Underground (2002) (Suijen)
Phoenix (2004) (Robita)
Tetsujin 28 (2004) (Professor Shikishima)
Black Lagoon (2006) (Wentzel Ahbe)
Spice and Wolf II (2009) (Lutz Eringin)
Naruto Shippuden (2010) (Tazuna)
Gate (2015) (Russian President Zyuganov)
Shōwa Genroku Rakugo Shinjū (2016) (Matsuda)
Ultraman (2019) (Alien Zetton Edo)
Jujutsu Kaisen (2020) (Takeda)
Yasuke (2021) (Abraham)

Unknown date
Devil Lady (Production Manager)
Fortune Quest L (Woodward)
The Kindaichi Case Files (man)
Yakitate!! Japan (Mash)

Theatrical animation
Mobile Suit Gundam: Char's Counterattack (1988) (October Salan)
Tetsujin 28: Hakuchū no Zangetsu (2007) (Professor Shikishima)
One Piece: Episode of Chopper: Bloom in the Winter, Miracle Sakura (2008) (Dr. Hiriluk)
In This Corner of the World (2016) (Entarō Hōjō)
The Legend of the Galactic Heroes: Die Neue These Seiran (2019) (Baghdash)

Video games
Kingdom Hearts (xxxx) (White Rabbit)
One Piece: Unlimited Adventure (xxxx) (Dr. Hiriluk)
Tales of Symphonia (2003) (Kvar)
Xenoblade Chronicles 2 (2017) (Eulogimenos)
Xenoblade Chronicles 2: Torna – The Golden Country (2018) (Tornan King)

Dubbing roles

Live-action
William Fichtner
Heat (1998 TV Asahi edition) (Roger Van Zant)
The Underneath (Tommy Dundee)
Go (Burke)
Passion of Mind (Aaron Reilly)
The Perfect Storm (David "Sully" Sullivan)
Black Hawk Down (SFC Jeff Sanderson)
Crash (Flanagan)
Kevin Pollak
A Few Good Men (Lieutenant Sam Weinberg)
Grumpy Old Men (Jacob Goldman)
House Arrest (Ned Beindorf)
Truth or Consequences, N.M. (Gordon Jacobson)
She's All That (Wayne Boggs)
David Paymer
City Hall (Abe Goodman)
Amistad (Secretary of State John Forsyth)
Mighty Joe Young (2004 TV Asahi edition) (Harry Ruben)
Payback (2003 TV Asahi edition) (Arthur Stegman)
Ocean's Thirteen (2010 Fuji TV edition) (V.U.P.)
Bill Paxton
Aliens (1993 TV Asahi edition) (Private William Hudson)
Monolith (Tucker)
True Lies (1996 Fuji TV edition) (Simon)
Vertical Limit (2003 TV Asahi edition) (Elliot Vaughn)
2 Guns (Earl)
David Schwimmer
Friends (Ross Geller)
Six Days Seven Nights (2001 Fuji TV edition) (Frank Martin)
Band of Brothers (Captain Herbert Sobel)
Big Nothing (Charlie)
Tom Sizemore
Harley Davidson and the Marlboro Man (1993 TV Asahi edition) (Chance Wilder)
Point Break (1993 NTV edition) (DEA Agent Dietz)
True Romance (1999 TV Tokyo edition) (Cody Nicholson)
Heat (Michael Cheritto)
Leland Orser
Seven (1998 Fuji TV edition) (Crazed Man in Massage Parlour)
Escape from L.A. (2000 Fuji TV edition) (Test Tube)
Taken (Sam)
Taken 2 (Sam)
28 Days (Cornell Shaw (Steve Buscemi))
The 6th Day (Michael Drucker (Tony Goldwyn))
Alien (1992 TV Asahi edition) (Kane (John Hurt))
Aliens (2004 TV Asahi edition) (Lieutenant William Gorman (William Hope))
Alien 3 (1998 TV Asahi edition) (Francis Aaron (Ralph Brown))
Alien: Resurrection (Doctor Gediman (Brad Dourif))
All About Eve (PDDVD edition) (Bill Simpson (Gary Merrill))
Anaconda (1999 TV Asahi edition) (Warren Westridge (Jonathan Hyde))
Antarctic Journal (Seo Jae-kyung (Choi Deok-moon))
Arachnophobia (Sheriff Lloyd Parsons (Stuart Pankin))
Australia (Neil Fletcher (David Wenham))
Awakening the Zodiac (Harvey (Matt Craven))
Bad Girls (William Tucker (James LeGros))
The Ballad of Buster Scruggs (René (Saul Rubinek))
Batman Begins (Judge Faden (Gerard Murphy), Fredericks (John Nolan))
A Beautiful Mind (John Nash (Russell Crowe))
Beverly Hills Cop III (Billy Rosewood (Judge Reinhold))
Big Fat Liar (Marty Wolf (Paul Giamatti))
The Big Lebowski (Blu-Ray edition) (Knox Harrington (David Thewlis))
Big Night (Primo (Tony Shalhoub))
Birdman (Riggan Thomson (Michael Keaton))
Black Panther: Wakanda Forever (Anderson Cooper)
Boomerang (Gerard Jackson (David Alan Grier))
Brain Games (Ted Danson)
Breaking Bad (Walter White (Bryan Cranston))
Bridge of Spies (Wolfgang Vogel (Sebastian Koch))
A Bridge Too Far (2007 DVD edition) (Brian Horrocks (Edward Fox))
Call of Heroes (Tither Liu (Liu Kai-chi))
Casablanca (2000 TV Tokyo edition) (Signor Ugarte (Peter Lorre))
Casper (VHS edition) (Doctor Harvey (Bill Pullman)
Casper (DVD edition) (Dibbs (Eric Idle))
Celebrity (Lee Simon (Kenneth Branagh))
Chain Reaction (Dr. Lu Chen (Tzi Ma))
Cliffhanger (1997 NTV edition) (Matheson (Vyto Ruginis))
Collateral Damage (Sean Armstrong (John Turturro))
Coming to America (1991 Fuji TV edition) (Darryl Jenks (Eriq La Salle))
Consenting Adults (David Duttonville (Forest Whitaker))
The Core (2005 TV Asahi edition) (Doctor Conrad Zimsky (Stanley Tucci))
Crash (Dr. Robert Vaughan (Elias Koteas))
Crocodile Dundee (Richard Mason (Mark Blum))
The Crown (Prince Edward, Duke of Windsor (Alex Jennings))
Dark Blue World (Oberleutnant Hesse (Thure Riefenstein))
Darkman (Peyton Westlake / Darkman (Liam Neeson))
Das Boot (2004 TV Tokyo edition) (Obermaschinist Johann (Erwin Leder))
The Day of the Jackal (Caron (Derek Jacobi))
Desperado (1998 TV Asahi edition) (Pick-up Guy (Quentin Tarantino))
Desperate Housewives (George Williams (Roger Bart))
The Devil's Double (Munem)
Die Hard (1990 TV Asahi edition) (Tony (Andreas Wisniewski))
Die Hard with a Vengeance (1999 TV Asahi edition) (Ricky Walsh (Anthony Peck))
Donnie Brasco (Sony edition) (Richie Gazzo (Rocco Sisto))
Dr. Dolittle series (Lucky the Dog (Norm Macdonald))
Bram Stoker's Dracula (1995 TV Asahi edition) (Doctor John Seward (Richard E. Grant)
Bram Stoker's Dracula (VHS/DVD edition) (R.M. Renfield (Tom Waits))
Entrapment (2007 TV Tokyo edition) (Hector Cruz (Will Patton))
E.T. the Extra-Terrestrial (2002 DVD edition) (Keys (Peter Coyote))
The Favourite (Sidney Godolphin (James Smith))
Fly Away Home (David Alden (Terry Kinney))
Frankenstein (Henry Clerval (Tom Hulce))
Genius (Jost Winteler (Nicholas Rowe))
Gentleman Jack (Christopher Rawson (Vincent Franklin))
The Getaway (1994 TV Asahi edition) (Thief at the railway station (Richard Bright))
Ghost (Willie Lopez (Rick Aviles))
Ghostbusters (1999 DVD edition) (Doctor Egon Spengler (Harold Ramis))
Ghostbusters II (1998 TV Asahi edition) (Doctor Janosz Poha (Peter MacNicol))
The Godfather (2001 DVD-box and 2008 Blu-ray editions) (Fredo Corleone (John Cazale))
The Godfather Part II (2001 DVD-box and 2008 Blu-ray editions) (Fredo Corleone (John Cazale))
Godzilla (Charles Caiman (Harry Shearer))
The Golden Compass (Fra Pavel (Simon McBurney))
GoldenEye (1999 TV Asahi edition) (Boris Grishenko (Alan Cumming))
The Green Mile (Eduard Delacroix (Michael Jeter))
Heart and Souls (Thomas Reilly (Robert Downey Jr.))
Hollow Man (2003 TV Asahi edition) (Frank Chase (Joey Slotnick))
House on Haunted Hill (Steven Price (Geoffrey Rush))
The Hunted (Kinjo (John Lone))
Hunter Killer (Captain Sergei Andropov (Michael Nyqvist))
Identity (George York (John C. McGinley))
Independence Day (1999 TV Asahi edition) (Doctor Brackish Okun (Brent Spiner))
Indiana Jones and the Temple of Doom (1998 TV Asahi edition) (Chattar Lal (Roshan Seth))
The Infiltrator (Robert Mazur/Bob Musella (Bryan Cranston))
In the Line of Fire (1996 TV Asahi edition) (Al D'Andrea (Dylan McDermott))
Ip Man (Chow Ching-chuen (Simon Yam))
Irréversible (Pierre (Albert Dupontel))
Jacob's Ladder (Michael Newman (Matt Craven))
JFK (Lee Harvey Oswald (Gary Oldman))
John Q. (Jimmy Palumbo (David Thornton))
Killing Me Softly (Senior Police Officer (Ian Hart))
Landscapers (Christopher Edwards (David Thewlis))
Last Action Hero (2001 TV Asahi edition) (The Ripper/Tom Noonan (Tom Noonan))
The Last Boy Scout (1998 TV Asahi edition) (Milo (Taylor Negron))
The Last Witch Hunter (Dolan 36 (Michael Caine))
Law & Order (Jack McCoy (Sam Waterston))
Lost (Benjamin Linus (Michael Emerson))
The Lost World: Jurassic Park (Peter Ludlow (Arliss Howard))
Mad Max 2 (1997 TV Asahi edition) (The Gyro Captain (Bruce Spence))
Master and Commander: The Far Side of the World (Captain Jack Aubrey (Russell Crowe))
A Midsummer Night's Dream (Puck (Stanley Tucci))
Minority Report (Gideon (Tim Blake Nelson))
The Misfits (Schultz (Tim Roth))
Morbius (Alberto "Al" Rodriguez (Al Madrigal))
Mortdecai (Spinoza (Paul Whitehouse))
The Mustang (Myles (Bruce Dern))
My Life Without Me (Dr. Thompson (Julian Richings))
Nash Bridges (Inspector Harvey Leek (Jeff Perry))
New Amsterdam (Dr. Vijay Kapoor (Anupam Kher))
No Good Deed (David Brewster (Jonathan Higgins))
Noel (Charles Boyd (Robin Williams))
The Offer (Charles Bluhdorn (Burn Gorman))
Once Upon a Time in China (So Sai-man (Jacky Cheung))
Out of Reach (Mister Elgin (Nick Brimble))
Outbreak (1998 NTV edition) (Casey Schuler (Kevin Spacey))
Oz (Tobias Beecher (Lee Tergesen))
Parenthood (1994 TV Tokyo edition) (Nathan Huffner (Rick Moranis))
Peggy Sue Got Married (Charlie (Nicolas Cage))
Phenomenon (George Malley (John Travolta))
Platoon (1989 TV Asahi edition) (Gardner)
Predator 2 (1994 TV Asahi edition) (Detective Danny Archuleta (Rubén Blades))
Punch-Drunk Love (Lance (Luis Guzmán))
Quiz Show (Dick Goodwin (Rob Morrow))
Reign of Fire (Barlow (Ned Dennehy))
Renegade (Bobby Sixkiller (Branscombe Richmond))
Rising Sun (Bob Richmond (Kevin Anderson))
RoboCop (2014) (Raymond Sellars (Michael Keaton))
The Salvation (Sheriff Mallick (Douglas Henshall))
Saw (Zep Hindle (Michael Emerson))
Scarface (2004 DVD edition) (Omar (F. Murray Abraham))
Screamers (2000 Fuji TV edition) (Private Michael 'Ace' Jefferson (Andrew Lauer))
Seabiscuit (Tom Smith (Chris Cooper))
A Series of Unfortunate Events (Ishmael (Peter MacNicol))
Seven Golden Men (1982 TV Tokyo edition) (Aldo (Gabriele Tinti))
Shallow Hal (Walt (Rene Kirby))
The Silence of the Lambs (VHS edition) (Jame Gumb (Ted Levine))
A Simple Plan (Jacob Mitchell (Billy Bob Thornton))
Snake Eyes (Lou Logan (Kevin Dunn))
Species III (Dr. Abbot (Robert Knepper))
Star Trek Generations (Doctor Tolian Soran (Malcolm McDowell))
Star Trek: The Next Generation (Lore (Brent Spiner))
Star Trek V: The Final Frontier (Hikaru Sulu (George Takei))
Street Kings (Captain James Biggs (Hugh Laurie))
Spotlight (Walter "Robby" Robinson (Michael Keaton))
The Stepford Wives (Roger Bannister (Roger Bart))
The Sting (2009 DVD/Blu-Ray edition) (J.J. Singleton (Ray Walston))
Super Mario Bros. (1994 NTV edition) (Iggy (Fisher Stevens))
The Sweetest Thing (Roger Donahue (Jason Bateman))
Teletubbies (Narrator)
Their Finest (Ambrose Hilliard (Bill Nighy))
Trading Places (Louis Winthorpe III (Dan Aykroyd))
Tristan & Isolde (Lord Wictred (Mark Strong))
Twister (Robert "Rabbit" Nurick (Alan Ruck))
Under Siege 2: Dark Territory (1998 TV Asahi edition) (Travis Dane (Eric Bogosian))
Unforgiven (W.W. Beauchamp (Saul Rubinek))
The Uninvited (Steven Ivers (David Strathairn))
The Untouchables (Oscar Wallace (Charles Martin Smith))
Viper (Frankie "X" Waters)
Wanted (2019 BS Japan edition) (The Exterminator (Konstantin Khabensky))
Wasabi (Maurice (Michel Muller))
Wild at Heart (Johnnie Farragut (Harry Dean Stanton))
Witness (1990 TV Asahi edition) (Daniel Hochleitner (Alexander Godunov))
The Young Pope (Don Tommaso Viglietti (Marcello Romolo))

Animation
Alice in Wonderland (Buena Vista edition) (White Rabbit)
Batman: The Animated Series (Mad Hatter (second voice), Lloyd Ventrix ("See No Evil"))
A Bug's Life
Dumbo (Timothy Q. Mouse)
Finding Dory (Charlie)
The Many Adventures of Winnie the Pooh (Pony Canyon edition) (Winnie the Pooh)
Monsters, Inc. (Jeff Fungus)
Peter Pan (Pony Canyon edition) (Mister Smee)
Pinocchio (Pony Canyon edition) (Lampwick)
Rango (Ambrose)
Robin Hood (Bandai edition) (Sir Hiss, Church Mouse)
Song of the South (Pony Canyon edition) (Br'er Bear)
The Sword in the Stone (Kay)

References

External links
 

1952 births
Male voice actors from Nagano Prefecture
Japanese male voice actors
Living people